Ridgeback may refer to:

Companies
Ridgeback (brand), a British bicycle brand
Ridgeback Resources, a Calgary, Alberta-based private oil exploration and production company
Ridgeback Biotherapeutics

Dogs
Phu Quoc ridgeback dog, a breed from Phu Quoc Island, Vietnam
Rhodesian Ridgeback, a breed indigenous to Southern Africa
Thai Ridgeback, a breed originating from Thailand

See also
Cougar (MRAP), a variant of which is the Ridgback PPV (Protected Patrol Vehicle)